Chelsea Holmes, known as just Holmes professionally, is an American comedian, actor and writer best known for her role as Kelly Mallet in the Fox sitcom Welcome to Flatch.
Holmes has appeared on stage as a stand-up comic and improvisational actor, and has built up a substantial online following.

After limited appearances in short films and television, Holmes landed the co-lead role in the Fox sitcom Welcome to Flatch, which premiered in 2022 and is now in its second season.

Personal Life 

Holmes' given first name is Chelsea, but they only use their last name in professional billing. 

Holmes graduated from Florida State University in 2016 with a Bachelor of Arts degree in English Language and Literature. She wrote for The Eggplant: FSU's satirical news source, and worked at the FSU radio station WVFS.

Holmes claims no birthplace or hometown in their professional profiles, stating they moved around so much as a child that no one place could be called “home”. They did mention on Lovett or Leave It podcast episode "The Artful Todger" that their mother lives in Kansas City. They have expressed a fondness for Chicago, where they lived for about four years.

Holmes is openly pansexual, and is comfortable with the pronouns she/her or they/them.

Filmography

Film

Television

References 

Living people
American actors
Florida State University alumni
Year of birth missing (living people)
Pansexual actresses